Attorney General Sloan may refer to:

A. Scott Sloan (1820–1895), Attorney General of Wisconsin
Gordon McGregor Sloan (1898–1959), Attorney General of British Columbia